The British League Knockout Cup 1965 was the 27th edition of the Knockout Cup. It was the first time that it was called the British League Knockout Cup following a reorganisation of speedway in the United Kingdom. West Ham Hammers won the cup and therefore secured the league and cup double.

First round

Round two

Third round

Third Round Replay

Semi-final

Final (First Leg)

Scorers
West Ham Hammers
 1)  Ken McKinlay 2* 2* 2* 3 2* - 11 (4)*
 2)  Reg Trott 3 3 3 1 2* - 12 (1)
 3)  Sverre Harrfeldt 3 3 3 3 3 - 15*
 4)  Brian Leonard 1 1 2 0 0 - 4
 5)  Norman Hunter Ef 3 3 3 3 - 12
 6)  Malcolm Simmons 2 2* 2* Ef 3 - 9 (2)
 7)   Tony Clarke 0 0 - 0
Exeter Falcons
 1)  Colin Gooddy 0 1 0 2 2 - 6
 2)  Des Lukehurst 1 1* 1 1* 1 - 5 (2)
 3)  Jimmy Squibb 2 0 1 1 0 - 4
 4)  lan Cowland 0 0 1 0 0 - 1
 5)  Chris Blewett 1 F N N N - 1
 6)  Jack Geran 3 2 2 2 1 - 10
 7)  Ivor Hughes 2 3 0 1* 1* - 7 (2)

Heat by Heat
 Ht 01: Trott, McKinlay, Lukehurst, Gooddy 75.4 
 Ht 02: Harrfeldt, Squibb, Leonard, Cowland 73.8
 Ht 03: Trott, Hughes, Lukehurst, Clarke (f rem) 76.4
 Ht 04: Harrfeldt, McKinlay, Gooddy, Squibb 75.2
 Ht 05: Geran, Simmons, Blewett (f rem), Hunter (ef) 75.8
 Ht 06: Trott, McKinlay, Squibb, Cowland 76.2
 Ht 07: Harrfeldt, Geran, Leonard, Blewett (f) 75.4 
 Ht 08: Hunter, Simmons, Lukehurst, Gooddy 75.4 
 Ht 09: Hughes, Leonard, Cowland, Clarke 77.6 
 Ht 10: McKinlay, Geran, Trott, Hughes 76.0
 Ht 11: Hunter, Simmons, Squibb, Cowland 75.2
 Ht 12: Harrfeldt, Gooddy, Lukehurst, Leonard 77.4 
 Ht 13: Hunter, Geran, Hughes, Simmons (ef) 76.2 
 Ht 14: Harrfeldt, McKinlay, Lukehurst, Cowland 76.2
 Ht 15: Simmons, Trott, Geran, Squibb 76.8 
 Ht 16: Hunter, Gooddy, Hughes, Leonard 77.2

Final (Second Leg)

Scorers
Exeter Falcons
 1)  Colin Gooddy Ef 3 2 3 2* - 10 (1)
 2)  Des Lukehurst 2 3 1* 0 0 - 6 (1)
 3)  Jack Geran 2 Ef Ef 2 3 -7
 4)  Chris Blewett Ret 1 3 Fx N - 4
 5)  lan Cowland 0 2 1* 3 Ef - 6 (1)
 6)  Jimmy Squibb 1 1* 2 2* 2 - 8 (2)
 7)  Ivor Hughes 2* 0 2 - 4 (1)
West Ham Hammers
 1)  Ken McKinlay 3 1* 3 3 3 - 13 (1)
 2)  Reg Trott 1 1 0 N 1 - 3
 3)  Sverre Harrfeldt 3 2 3 3 3 - 14
 4)  Brian Leonard 1 0 2 0 F - 3
 5)  Norman Hunter 3 3 2 Ef 1 - 9
 6)  Malcolm Simmons 2* 2* 1* 1 1 - 7 (3)
 7)  Tony Clarke 0 1* 1 - 2 (1)

Heat by Heat
 Ht 01: McKinlay, Lukehurst, Trott, Gooddy (ef) 75.0
 Ht 02: Harrfeldt, Geran, Leonard, Blewett (ret) 74.8
 Ht 03: Lukehurst, Hughes, Trott, Clarke 75.2 5 1 9 9
 Ht 04: Gooddy, Harrfeldt, McKinlay, Geran (ef) 74.0
 Ht 05: Hunter, Simmons, Squibb, Cowland 75.0
 Ht 06: Harrfeldt, Gooddy, Lukehurst, Leonard 74.2
 Ht 07: Hunter, Simmons, Blewett, Geran (ef) 75.2
 Ht 08: McKinlay, Cowland, Squibb, Trott 75.8
 Ht 09: Blewett, Leonard, Clarke, Hughes 75.6
 Ht 10: Gooddy, Hunter, Simmons, Lukehurst 74.6
 Ht 11: Harrfeldt, Squibb, Cowland, Leonard 75.0
 Ht 12: McKinlay, Geran, Clarke, Blewett (f exc) 75.4
 Ht 13: Cowland, Squibb, Simmons, Hunter (ef) 76.8
 Ht 14: Geran, Gooddy, Trott, Leonard (f) 75.8
 Ht 15: Harrfeldt, Squibb, Simmons, Lukehurst 75.0 
 Ht 16: McKinlay, Hughes, Hunter, Cowland (ef) 76.0

See also
1965 British League season
Knockout Cup (speedway)

References

 
Speedway leagues
1965 in British motorsport
1965 in speedway
Speedway competitions in the United Kingdom